Richard Dumbrill (born 19 November 1938) is a former South African cricketer who played in five Test matches from 1965 to 1966. In his first test, he took 3-31 and 4–30 against England at Lord's.

Following his cricket career, he emigrated from South Africa to the United States where he married and had two children. He currently lives in the Boston area.

References

1938 births
Living people
South Africa Test cricketers
South African cricketers
South African Universities cricketers
Gauteng cricketers
KwaZulu-Natal cricketers